Crossgates Mall is an enclosed, automobile-oriented, super-regional shopping mall located in the Albany, New York suburb of Guilderland. It is the largest indoor shopping center in the Capital District, and the third largest in the State of New York. The anchor stores are Primark (Coming 2023), Macy's, JCPenney, Burlington, Best Buy, Forever 21, and Dick's Sporting Goods.

History

Pre-1970s
Crossgates Mall is built is within the Albany Pine Bush, one of the largest of the world's 20 inland pine barrens. It was formed thousands of years ago, following the drainage of Lake Albany. When Europeans arrived in the early 17th century, the Pine Bush was in use as hunting grounds and firewood supply of the Mohawk nation of the Haudenosaunee to the west along the Mohawk River, and the Mahican to the east, along the Hudson River.

Proposal, Opposition, and Construction
In the 1970s, Syracuse-based Pyramid Management Group, Inc. (Pyramid) began purchasing lands within the Pine Bush with the intent to develop a shopping mall, but it wasn't until 1978 that their plans were revealed to the public. The initial proposal called for a $50 million mall on a  lot with six anchor stores, 100 vendors, a food court, and direct access from the Adirondack Northway.  Opposition from residents and environmentalists was rapid and widespread. The first public hearing on the project was attended by more than 300 speakers, the majority of whom opposed the projects on the grounds that it would destroy a large swath of the unique and ecologically sensitive Pine Bush, would contribute to the continuing urbanization of Guilderland, would cause traffic congestion, and would not provide the claimed economic benefits, among other objections. Despite widespread opposition, a petition from a citizen's group known as the Concerned Citizens Against Crossgates, and an embattled town board, the project was approved rapidly. In opposition, the town supervisor at the time stated: "Taking into consideration that the majority of the correspondence I got was opposed to the Crossgates, and (a) feeling that I have that, in the future that part of town will just be a conglomeration of traffic, I am forced to vote in the negative." The decision was the cause of at least one town official's resignation. During the four years following the unveiling of the proposal, the town board only voted unanimously on one aspect of the project: that the town should receive its full share of the resulting tax revenue.

Early years
The mall opened on March 4, 1984. Although Pyramid had initially planned for a 1.3 million square footprint with six anchors, at opening it occupied only  and had four anchors:  a Caldor, Jordan Marsh, Filene's, and JCPenney. Of the roughly 170 smaller vendor spaces, 80 were occupied. It was the seventh enclosed shopping mall built by Pyramid, part of a nationwide boom in shopping center openings that peaked at 2,600 in 1985.

Throughout the 1980s, Pyramid sought to expand the mall into the footprint originally envisioned, but were repeatedly rebuffed by the Town.

Expansion
In October 1994 the mall underwent an expansion nearly doubling its footprint to almost  and providing space for up to 250 stores. Following this expansion, Lord & Taylor, Hoyts Cinemas, and a new Filene’s store opened as anchors. The original Filene’s space was partially occupied by a Dick’s Sporting Goods. In 1996, anchor Jordan Marsh was replaced by Macy's when the Jordan Marsh brand was retired. 

Following widespread citizen protests, the Guilderland Town Board rejected the required zoning changes.

In 1999, Cohoes Fashions relocated their store from their historic location in downtown Cohoes, New York. In 2007 their parent company, Burlington Coat Factory, closed many of the Cohoes locations and branded those that remained as Burlington Coat Factory. Caldor went out of business the same year. Their space at the mall's center court was split between a Best Buy on the second floor and an H&M on the first. Lord & Taylor would build a store in 2014. In 2021, it was announced the legendary division would shutter. Its set to become a Primark.

Recent Years 
Pyramid achieved a degree of success developing casual dining and entertainment categories during the mid-2010's. Among them are Maggie McFly's, Funny Bone, 110 Grill, 5 Wits, Get Air, and APEX. 
As of 2022, the mall has experienced modest growth with the announcement of new retailers, such as Earthbound Trading Co, Urban Outfitters, Lovesac, Offline by Aerie, and Primark.

In August 2017 Pyramid announced a plan to construct a hotel in partnership with Hilton. The hotel opened in 2018, achieving a strategic goal Pyramid had held since at least the late 1990s. It opened under the Homewood Suites, aimed at long-term stays, and the Tru brand, aimed at younger travelers. Both brands are owned by Hilton.

On the heels of the hotel opening, Pyramid announced a plan to develop three sites adjacent to mall. Initially, this called for 222 residential units and a Costco. The latter was to be developed on a lot that would require demolition of a "ghost neighborhood", consisting of homes Pyramid had purchased in the preceding two decades. Within a month, local environmental watchdog group Save the Pine Bush, residents, and other groups sued Pyramid alleging that clearcutting of the Costco site had occurred in violation of the SEQRA and the 14th Amendment. The suit was later dismissed.

Description  
Crossgates Mall is a super-regional shopping mall located in the hamlet of Westmere, in the Albany, New York suburb of Guilderland. Vehicular access is available from Western Avenue, Washington Avenue Extension, and a ramp just south of Adirondack Northway terminus. There are 10-12 parking lots. Public transit is available via a major bus stop served by multiple Capital District Transportation Authority routes.

Both Crossgates Mall and the nearby Crossgates Commons shopping plaza are owned and operated by the Pyramid Management Group, Inc. through multiple subsidiaries. When the Primark store opens in 2022, the mall will be anchored by Primark, Macy's, JCPenney, Burlington, Best Buy, Dick's Sporting Goods, and Forever 21.

References

Bibliography

External links 
Crossgates Mall Official Site

Shopping malls in Albany County, New York
The Pyramid Companies
Guilderland, New York
Shopping malls in New York (state)